John Alexander Thomas Shirlow (13 December 1869 – 22 June 1936) was an Australian artist.

Shirlow was born in Sunbury, Victoria, son of Robert Shirlow, a graduate of Trinity College, Dublin, who had come from Ireland and followed many occupations in the new land without much success. His mother was formerly Miss Rebecca Flanagan.

Shirlow was educated at various state schools and Scotch College, Melbourne, and went to work first at Haase Duffus and Company, printers, and then in 1889 with Sands and McDougall. He began attending evening classes at the National Gallery of Victoria Art School in 1890 and continued there for five years. Towards the end of his course, influenced largely by the Rembrandt and Whistler prints at the Melbourne national gallery, he began to practise etching. His difficulties were great for he had to make his own press and correct his own mistakes. His first plate was etched in 1895 and he continued his craft until the end of his life. Most of his work is pure etching, but he did a few aquatints and mezzotints.

In 1913 Shirlow joined the electric supply department of the Melbourne City Council, he had studied electricity at the Melbourne technical school, and he also began to act as an examiner in drawing for the public examinations of the University of Melbourne. In 1917 a small volume, 'Etchings by John Shirlow', with reproductions of 25 of his plates was published at Sydney, and had a large sale. This was followed in 1920 by 'The Etched Work of John Shirlow', with a biography, by R. H. Croll, and a chronological list of 89 of his prints. In 1920, with Albert Henry Fullwood, he co-founded the Australian Painter-Etchers' Society. In 1922 he was made a trustee of the public library, museums and national gallery of Victoria, and soon afterwards became drawing master at Scotch College, Melbourne. In 1932 he published 'Perspective', a textbook for the use of schools. He died at home in the Melbourne suburb of Caulfield. He married in 1895, Grace Nixon, who survived him with four children. A bronze head of Shirlow by Charles Web Gilbert is in the trustees' room at the national gallery, Melbourne.

Shirlow was a man of medium height with a fine rugged head and strong prejudices. He was interested in music and literature and did a fair amount of journalism on artistic subjects. In his etchings he was not a great draughtsman, but his buildings are solidly drawn and his masses well arranged. He was less successful in his figure work. He is represented at the British Museum, the national galleries of Melbourne, Sydney, Adelaide and Perth, and at Stockholm, Bendigo, Geelong and Castlemaine. The finest collection is at the Mitchell Library, Sydney, which has practically all of his important prints. Though a few earlier men had experimented in etching, Shirlow will always be remembered as the first man in Australia to do work in this medium with any distinction.

Exhibitions
1931, 3 November - 17 December: Group show with Allan Jordan, Esther Paterson and Charles Nuttall. Fine Art Galleries, Melbourne
 1934, to 29 September: Newman Gallery; group show with sixteen other exhibitors, including Allan Jordan, Victor Cobb, Oscar Binder, J. C. Goodhart, Sydney Ure Smith, Jessie C. Traill, Harold Herbert, John C. Goodchild, Cyril Dillon and Charles Nuttall.

References

1869 births
1930 deaths
Australian etchers
People from Sunbury, Victoria
Australian people of Irish descent
20th-century Australian male artists
19th-century Australian male artists
National Gallery of Victoria Art School alumni
People educated at Scotch College, Melbourne